

Portugal
 Angola – Manuel de Almeida e Vasconcelos, Governor of Angola (1790–1797)
 Macau –
 D. Vasco Luis Carneiro de Sousa e Faro, Governor of Macau (1790–1793)
 Jose Manuel Pinto, Governor of Macau (1793–1797)

Kingdom of Great Britain
 New South Wales – Arthur Phillip, Governor of New South Wales (1788 – May 1793); John Hunter commissioned as Governor but did not arrive in the colony until 1795

Colonial governors
Colonial governors
1793